SDF4, SDF-4, Sdf4, Sdf-4 may represent:

 Stromal cell derived factor 4 - SDF4
 SDF-4 Izumo or SDF-4 Liberator, a fictional spaceship in the Robotech saga